Paul William Bracewell (born 19 July 1962) is an English former professional football player and manager.

Bracewell played as a midfielder. He was a member of the Everton side that won the League title in 1985 and 1987 as well as the European Cup Winner's Cup in 1985. He also played in the Premier League for Newcastle United and Sunderland and in the Football League with Stoke City and Fulham. He was capped three times by England and earned thirteen England U21 caps.

Following his retirement, he managed Fulham, before being replaced by Jean Tigana. He later had a spell in charge of Halifax Town but following his departure in 2001 he has not returned to management. He has since had several coaching roles at former side, Sunderland.

Club career
Bracewell was born in Heswall and started his football career with Stoke City progressing through the youth ranks at the Victoria Ground and made his professional debut away at Wolverhampton Wanderers just before his 18th birthday. He soon became a regular in the first team and went on to complete three full seasons before in June 1983 he moved to Sunderland for a fee of £250,000 linking up with Alan Durban. He made 141 appearances for Stoke scoring six goals.

Sunderland had an unsuccessful 1983–84 season and Durban was sacked by the Roker Park club and new manager Len Ashurst did not believe Bracewell could play for him and so sold him to Everton for £425,000. It was at Goodison Park where Bracewell enjoyed the most successful spell of his career. As part of a midfield that included Peter Reid, Kevin Sheedy and Trevor Steven, they won the 1984–85 Football League and also enjoyed success in Europe when they lifted the 1984–85 European Cup Winners' Cup. Such form prompted a call-up to the full England squad where he went on to win three caps but missed out on a place in Bobby Robson's 1986 World Cup squad with a broken leg. Bracewell also played in four losing FA Cup Finals, the last of which came following his return to Sunderland in 1992. This is a record for the most FA Cup Final appearances by a player without winning.

He left Sunderland for the second time to join archrivals Newcastle United but returned to Wearside in 1995 and helped Sunderland gain promotion to the Premier League. Unable to keep down a place in the years that followed, Bracewell reunited with his former Newcastle manager Kevin Keegan at Fulham in 1997. He retired from playing football in 1999 to take up a Managerial role at Fulham.

International career
In 1985, he earned three England caps.

Managerial career
In September 1997, Bracewell took a similar role with ambitious Division Two club Fulham, working under head coach Ray Wilkins and director of football Kevin Keegan. When Wilkins was dismissed at the end of the season, Keegan took sole charge of the first team and kept Bracewell as his assistant. Keegan accepted the offer to become England national football team manager in March 1999, but remained in charge of the Fulham team until the end of that season, guiding them to the Division Two title with 101 points, before quitting as Fulham manager. Bracewell was promoted to the position of manager, and despite them competing in the top half of Division One throughout the campaign, he was dismissed on 30 March 2000 in favour of the more experienced Jean Tigana, who achieved promotion to the Premier League a year later. He scored once during his spell with Fulham in a 2–0 win against Wycombe Wanderers in September 1998.

In October 2000 he became manager of Halifax Town although his stint there lasted less than a year. He resigned from the club 4 games into the 2001/02 season. During his brief spell in charge he steered to the team to just 11 wins in 41 games, which included a 2–0 home FA cup exit at the hands of non league Gateshead.

Coaching career
In 2013, he was appointed as Development Coach for the Sunderland Under 21s and 18s and helped with the transition between the two. In June 2015, after assisting Dick Advocaat with first team duties at the end of the 2014–15 season, he was appointed First Team Coach at Sunderland, and shortly afterwards was promoted to the role of Assistant Manager. He left his role with Sunderland on 17 June 2017.

Career statistics

Club

International

Honours
Individual
PFA Team of the Year: 1997–98 Second Division

References

External links
 
 Paul Bracewell Tribute

1962 births
Living people
English footballers
England international footballers
England under-21 international footballers
Everton F.C. players
Sunderland A.F.C. players
Stoke City F.C. players
Newcastle United F.C. players
Fulham F.C. players
English football managers
Halifax Town A.F.C. managers
Fulham F.C. managers
Premier League players
People from Heswall
English Football League players
Association football midfielders
FA Cup Final players